Integrimi  is a newspaper published in Albania.

Content

Sections
The newspaper is organized in three sections, including the magazine.
 News: Includes International, National, Tirana, Politics, Business, Technology, Science, Health, Sports, Education.
 Opinion: Includes Editorials, Op-Eds and Letters to the Editor.
 Features: Includes Arts, Movies, Theatre, and Sport.

Web presence
Integrimi has had a web presence since 2007. Accessing articles requires no registration.

Pricing
The paper's price is 20 Leke and could by bought by local shops. The newspaper is for subscribers available in Albania.

References

Party newspapers published in Albania
Mass media in Tirana